Serenade is a private housing estate in Tai Hang, Causeway Bay, Wan Chai District, Hong Kong Island, Hong Kong. It has two residential towers each 53 storeys tall and a clubhouse with an outdoor swimming pool. Construction completed in January of 2010 with 275 flats. Before Serenade began construction, the site was occupied by Lai Sing Court.

Politics
Serenade is located in Tin Hau constituency of the Wan Chai District Council. It was formerly represented by Chan Yuk-lam, who was elected in the 2019 elections until July 2021.

References

Tai Hang
Private housing estates in Hong Kong